Trapped by Fear is a 1960 French film originally entitled Les distractions starring Jean Paul Belmondo and directed by Jacques Dupont.

It had admissions in France of 955,037.

Plot

Cast 
 Jean-Paul Belmondo as Paul Frapier 
 Alexandra Stewart  as Véra 
 Claude Brasseur as Laurent Porte 
 Sylva Koscina  as  Arabelle 
 Eva Damien  as  Dany 
 Sady Rebbot  as le photographe de mode
 Corrado Guarducci  as  l'ami d'Arabelle
 Linda Sini  as  la concierge
 Jacques Jouanneau  as  Maxime
 Yves Brainville  as  le commissaire de police
 Mireille Darc  as  Maïa 
 Claude Chabrol  as  Himself
 Annette Stroyberg  as  Herself

References

External links

Trapped by Fear at Le Film Guide

French crime drama films
1960 films
Films directed by Jacques Dupont
1960s French films